Lębork Mosty is a PKP railway station in Mosty (Pomeranian Voivodeship), Poland, on the Eastern end of the town of Lębork.

Lines crossing the station

Train services
The station is served by the following services:

Regional services (R) Tczew — Słupsk  
Regional services (R) Malbork — Słupsk  
Regional services (R) Elbląg — Słupsk  
Regional services (R) Słupsk — Bydgoszcz Główna 
Regional services (R) Słupsk — Gdynia Główna
Szybka Kolej Miejska services (SKM) (Lebork -) Wejherowo - Reda - Rumia - Gdynia - Sopot - Gdansk

References 

Lębork Mosty article at Polish Stations Database

Railway stations in Pomeranian Voivodeship
Lębork County